The following is a list of places named after Cesar Chavez, an American labor leader and civil rights activist:

Communities

Texas

 César Chávez (unincorporated area in Hidalgo County)

Parks

Arizona
César Chávez Square (Phoenix)
César Chávez Park (Laveen)

California

25th & Commercial station (San Diego) (Orange Line SDMTS Trolley Station, trains bound for Courthouse (Downtown) & Arnele Ave. (El Cajon) stations)
Plaza de César Chávez (San Jose)
Cesar E. Chavez Plaza (Sacramento)
César E. Chávez Waterfront Park (San Diego)
César E. Chávez Park (Delano)
César E. Chávez Park (Oakland)
César Chávez Park (Berkeley)
César E. Chávez Park (Modesto)
César E. Chávez Park (Colton)
César Chávez Community Center (Riverside) (2060 University Ave, also known as the César Chávez Auditorium)
Cesar E Chavez Park (Long Beach)
Cesar E. Chavez National Monument (Keene)
César Chávez Library (San Jose)
Cesar Chavez Middle School (Union City)
César Chávez High School (Stockton)

Colorado
Cesar E. Chavez Park (Denver)

Nevada
 César E. Chávez Park (Las Vegas)

Washington
Cesar Chavez Park (Seattle)

Major streets

Arizona 
Cesar Chavez Blvd (San Luis) (formerly G Street)
César Chávez Street (San Luis) (formerly 3rd Avenue)
Cesar Chavez Avenue (Somerton) (formerly Avenue F)

California 
Avenida Cesar Chavez (Los Angeles) (formerly Brooklyn Avenue, Macy Street and part of Sunset Boulevard)
Calle César Chávez (Santa Barbara) (formerly South Salsipuedes Street)
César Chávez Drive (Oxnard) (newer street planned to commemorate César Chávez)
César E. Chávez Parkway (San Diego) (formerly Crosby Street)
César Chávez Street (Brawley) (formerly North 10th Street)
Cesar Chavez Street (San Francisco) (formerly Army Street)

Idaho 
César Chávez Lane (Boise, Idaho)

New Mexico 
Avenida César Chávez (Albuquerque) (formerly Stadium Boulevard)

Michigan
Chávez Drive (Flint) (Interstate 475 Service Drive through downtown)
César E. Chávez Avenue (Grand Rapids) (formerly Grandville Avenue, renamed in 2022)
César E. Chávez Avenue (Lansing) (East Grand River Avenue, Beginning at Oakland Avenue to Washington Avenue and West Grand River Avenue)
César E. Chávez Avenue (Pontiac) (Business U.S. Highway 24)

Minnesota
Cesar Chavez Avenue (Minneapolis) (formerly 4th Ave N)
César Chávez Street (Saint Paul) (formerly Concord St)

Missouri
Avenida César Chávez (Kansas City) (formerly 23rd Street)

Oregon 

César Chávez Boulevard (Portland) (formerly NE/SE 39th Ave)

Texas 
Cesar Chavez Memorial Highway (Corpus Christi) (Texas State Highway 44)
Cesar Chavez Street (Austin) (formerly 1st Street)
César Chávez Boulevard (Dallas) (formerly South Central Expressway)
César Chávez Border Highway (El Paso) (Texas State Highway Loop 375; formerly Border Highway)
César Chávez Boulevard (Houston) (formerly 67th Street)
 Cesar Chavez/67th Street station
César Chávez Boulevard (San Antonio) (formerly Durango Boulevard)
César E. Chávez Drive (Lubbock) (formerly Canyon Lakes Drive)
César Chávez Rd. (San Juan)

Utah 
500 South in Salt Lake City bears the honorary designation Cesar E. Chavez Boulevard
30th Street in Ogden bears the honorary designation Cesar E. Chavez Street
2320 South in West Valley City bears the honorary designation Cesar Chavez Drive

Wisconsin 

César E. Chávez Drive (Milwaukee) (formerly S. 16th Street)

Libraries

Arizona
César E. Chávez Regional Branch (Phoenix)

California
Maywood César Chávez Library (Maywood) 
César E. Chávez Branch Library (Oakland) 
Cesár Chávez Public Library (Salinas) 
César Chávez Central Library (Stockton) 
Cesar Chavez Library (Perris)

Cesar Chavez Library- 2100 Moorpark Ave., San Jose, CA 95128

Michigan
Cesar E. Chavez Collection/Colección Cesar E. Chavez, East Lansing, Michigan

K-12 schools

Arizona
César Chávez Elementary School (San Luis)
César Chávez Community School (Phoenix, Arizona)
César Chávez High School (Laveen, Arizona)

California
Chávez High School (Delano)
César Chávez Learning Academies (San Fernando)
Chávez High School (Santa Ana)
Cesar Chavez High School (Stockton)
César E. Chávez School for Social Change (Santa Cruz)
César Chávez Middle School (San Bernardino)
César Chávez Middle School (Hayward)
Cesar Chavez Elementary School (Calexico)
César Chávez Elementary School (Coachella)
Cesar Chavez Elementary School (Corona)
César Chávez Elementary School (Davis)
César Chávez Elementary School (Greenfield)
César E. Chávez Elementary School (Norwalk)
César Chávez Elementary School (Oxnard) (formerly Juanita Elementary School)
César E. Chávez Intermediate School (Sacramento)
César Chávez Elementary School (Salinas)
César Chávez Elementary School (San Francisco)
César Chávez Elementary School (San Jose)
Cesar E. Chavez Academy (East Palo Alto)
Cesar Chavez Elementary School  (San Diego)
Cesar Chavez Middle School (Oceanside)
Cesar E. Chavez Elementary School (Bell Gardens)
César Estrada Chávez Dual Language Immersion School (Santa Barbara)
Cesar E. Chavez Elementary School (Madera)
Cesar Chavez Continuation High School (Compton)
Cesar E. Chavez Middle School (Planada)
Cesae E. Chavez Middle School (Ceres, California )

Colorado
Chávez Huerta K-12 Preparatory Academy (Pueblo, Colorado)

Illinois
César E. Chávez Multicultural Academic Center (Chicago)

Maryland
César Chávez Elementary School (Unincorporated Prince George's County - Hyattsville address)

Minnesota
Academia Cesar Chavez Charter School (St. Paul)

Michigan
Cesar Chavez Academy (Detroit)
César E. Chávez Elementary School (Grand Rapids)

New Mexico
César E. Chávez Elementary School (Las Cruces)
César Chávez Elementary School (Santa Fe)
César Chavez Charter High School (Deming)

Ohio
César Chavez College Preparatory School (Columbus)

Oklahoma
 César Chávez Elementary School (Oklahoma City)

Oregon
César E. Chávez Elementary School (Eugene)
 César Chávez School (Portland)

Texas

 Chávez High School (Houston)
 César Chávez Academy (Corpus Christi)
 César Chávez Middle School (La Joya)
 César Chávez Middle School (Waco)
 César Chávez Elementary School (Dallas)
 César Chávez Elementary School (Fort Worth)
 César Chávez Elementary School (Little Elm)
 César Chávez Elementary School (Pharr)
 César Chávez Academy (El Paso)

Washington, D.C.
César Chávez Public Charter Schools for Public Policy

Wisconsin
César Chávez Elementary School (Unincorporated Dane County - Madison address)

Post-secondary schools

Arizona
 César Chávez Building, (Formerly the Econ Building) University of Arizona (Tucson)

California

 César Chávez Student Center, University of California, Berkeley (Berkeley)
 César E. Chávez Student Services Center, Southwestern College (Chula Vista)
 César Chávez Campus of the Fresno Adult School (Fresno)
 César E. Chávez Department of Chicana and Chicano Studies at UCLA (Los Angeles)
 César E. Chávez Campus of San Diego Continuing Education (San Diego)
 Cesar Chavez Student Center, San Francisco State University (San Francisco)
 César Chávez Building (A building), Santa Ana College (Santa Ana)

Colorado
 César Chávez Cultural Center  at the University of Northern Colorado

Michigan 

 César Chávez Lounge at the University of Michigan

New York
 Chávez Hall, Stony Brook University (Brookhaven)

Former places

Post-secondary schools

Oregon

 Colegio César Chávez

References

Cesar Chavez
Cesar Chavez